Darren Denneman (born 23 March 1968) is a former Australian rules footballer who played with Geelong and the Sydney Swans in the Victorian/Australian Football League (VFL/AFL).

Denneman was recruited locally by Geelong, from Ocean Grove. He made four appearances in the 1988 VFL season but didn't feature at all in 1989. Sydney acquired him in the 1989 VFL Draft and he played three games for them in 1990.

He now works for AFL NSW/ACT.

References

1968 births
Australian rules footballers from Victoria (Australia)
Geelong Football Club players
Sydney Swans players
New Norfolk Football Club players
Living people